Girlfriends is a 1978 comedy-drama film produced and directed by Claudia Weill and written by Vicki Polon. The film stars Melanie Mayron as Susan Weinblatt, a Jewish photographer who experiences loneliness once her roommate Anne (Anita Skinner) moves out of their apartment in New York City. It was the first American independent film to be funded with grants, although private investors were also brought on to help complete the film.

Although the film began shooting in November 1975, it took almost three years to finish because the initial budget of $80,000 ran out. After distribution was picked up by Warner Bros., the film was released on August 11, 1978.

In 2019, the film was selected for preservation in the United States National Film Registry by the Library of Congress as being "culturally, historically, or aesthetically significant".

Plot
Photographer Susan Weinblatt supports herself by shooting baby pictures, weddings, and bar mitzvahs while she aims for an exhibit of her work in a gallery. Her best friend and roommate, Anne Munroe, is an aspiring writer.

After she sells three of her pictures to a magazine, Susan thinks she has left the world of portraits and wedding photography behind her, but her life begins to fall apart when Anne moves out and marries her boyfriend, Martin, and she can't manage to sell any more photographs

Susan develops a crush on Rabbi Gold, who works at the bar mitzvahs and weddings she photographs. The two kiss, but before they start an affair, she accidentally meets his wife and son, which puts a damper on their relationship.

After scamming her way into a meeting with a gallery owner, Susan is recommended to another gallerist and is finally able to get her own show. She also gets a boyfriend, Eric. She later fights with Anne, as Anne is jealous of her independence while Susan resents Anne's marriage and child. Later on, she fights with Eric over her insistence on maintaining her own apartment.

At her gallery showing, all of Susan's friends and family show up to support her except for Anne, who Martin tells her has gone to the countryside alone in order to work. Susan goes to the countryside to see Anne. Anne apologizes for not going to see her show and reveals that she had an abortion that morning, not wanting more children.

The two drink tequila shots and play games, but are interrupted by Martin's arrival.

Cast

Production
The film started as a 30-minute film funded by a grant from the American Film Institute, but upon completion, Weill realized that she wanted to explore what would happen next in the story. That short film eventually became the first seven minutes of the feature film. Original funding for the feature film came from National Endowment for the Arts and New York State Council on the Arts, totaling $80,000. Principal photography was effectively six and a half weeks, but those days were stretched over the span of a year because the production kept running out of money. When the grant money ran out, Weill had to seek out private investors to help complete the film. Once the film was finished, she took the film to Hollywood studios, and sold it to Warner Brothers for world distribution. They also signed a contract with Weill to direct two more features.

Release
The film premiered at the International Film Festival Rotterdam, as well as screening at Cannes and other festivals. It opened in New York on August 11, 1978. Girlfriends was set to be reissued across selected UK cinemas from 23 July 2021 via Park Circus (company).

Reception
Girlfriends received positive notices from critics. A review in Variety wrote, "This is a warm, emotional and at times wise picture about friendship, a film deserving of a wide audience. It's documentary filmmaker Claudia Weill's first feature, although there's no reason to apologetically pigeonhole this movie as a 'promising first feature.' It's the work of a technically skilled and assured director." Gene Siskel of the Chicago Tribune gave the film 3 stars out of 4 and called it "a nice little picture" that "plays out its drama in an episodic, European style — small vignettes leading forward in time." Charles Champlin of the Los Angeles Times described it as "a candid, intelligent, informed, affectionate, deeply affecting and wryly funny examination of the lives of young career women in Manhattan now." Gary Arnold of The Washington Post wrote that the film "suffers from such a threadbare screenplay and tentative personality that one can't help marveling at its shlumpy appeal." Geoff Brown of The Monthly Film Bulletin wrote, "The clarity of Weill's focus, along with the witty script and keen performances, keeps Girlfriends for the most part likeably spry and intelligent."

In 1978, Girlfriends won the Bronze Leopard award for Best Actress at the Locarno International Film Festival and the People's Choice Award at the Toronto International Film Festival. In 1979 it won the Special David award at the David di Donatello Awards. That year, it was nominated for a Golden Globe award and a BAFTA Award.

Stanley Kubrick brought up the film in 1980 when being interviewed by Vicente Molina Foix at Kubrick's house:

The film holds a 96% score on Rotten Tomatoes, based on 25 reviews.

Home media
Girlfriends was released on DVD in the United States (Region 1) on May 28, 2010 as part of the Warner Archive Collection.

In August 2020, it was announced that the film would be made available for the first time on Blu-ray via The Criterion Collection, which was released November 10, 2020. The set contains a new 4K restoration, as well as new special features, including cast and crew interviews, two short films: "Joyce at 34" and "Commuters", theatrical trailer, and essays by critic Molly Haskell and scholar Carol Gilligan.

References

External links
 
 
 
 
 Girlfriends: Second Births an essay by Molly Haskell at the Criterion Collection

1978 films
1978 comedy-drama films
American comedy-drama films
American independent films
1978 directorial debut films
1970s English-language films
Films about abortion
Films directed by Claudia Weill
Films scored by Michael Small
Films set in New York City
Films shot in New York City
United States National Film Registry films
1970s female buddy films
1970s feminist films
1970s American films
Toronto International Film Festival People's Choice Award winners